Descente du Mont Serrat is a 1901 French short black-and-white silent documentary film directed by Segundo de Chomón.

See also 
 List of French films before 1910

External links 
 

1901 films
French black-and-white films
French short documentary films
French silent short films
Films directed by Segundo de Chomón
1900s short documentary films
1901 directorial debut films
1900s French films